Nadia, Butterfly is a 2020 Canadian sports drama film, directed by Pascal Plante and released in 2020.

The film stars Katerine Savard as Nadia, an Olympic swimmer struggling to redefine her life after retiring from the sport at the conclusion of the 2020 Summer Olympics. Its cast also includes Canadian competitive swimmers Ariane Mainville and Hilary Caldwell in supporting roles as Nadia's friends and teammates, as well as Pierre-Yves Cardinal.

Cast
 Katerine Savard as Nadia
 Ariane Mainville as Marie-Pierre
 Pierre-Yves Cardinal as Sébastien
 Hilary Caldwell as Karen
 Cailin McMurray as Jess

Production and distribution
Plante wrote the film in part based on his own experiences as a competitive swimmer who tried out, but did not qualify, to represent Canada at the 2008 Summer Olympics. He has described the film as "basically a film about the post-Olympic blues, the very tipping point of that transition from being an athlete to having to redefine herself and understanding what it means to leave it all behind". Savard, an Olympic swimmer, auditioned for the role after being one of the swimmers Plante consulted for input into the screenplay. The film was shot in Montreal and Tokyo in 2019, with swimming scenes filmed at Montreal's real Olympic Pool from the 1976 Summer Olympics.

The film was named as an Official Selection of the 2020 Cannes Film Festival, but was not screened due to the cancellation of the physical festival in light of the COVID-19 pandemic. It had its commercial premiere on September 18, 2020.

Reception

Critical response
For The Hollywood Reporter, David Rooney wrote that "Most movies about the physical rigors and psychological toll that force high-performance athletes to give up their chosen discipline — whether it's swimming, track and field, ballet or any other — tend to focus on the pain and injuries, the punishing schedule, the exhaustion, the disappointments of a career in decline. What makes Plante's drama distinctive is that the decision to quit has already been made both privately and publicly, and the detachment is already in process as Nadia (Katerine Savard) gives an awkward press interview while she's still catching her breath after an individual race toward the close of the Tokyo Summer Olympics. "I guess I'm trying to end on a good note", she says, visibly anxious to step away".

Writing for The Globe and Mail, Barry Hertz stated that the unfortunate coincidence of the film's timing, having been filmed before but released after the cancellation of the 2020 Tokyo Olympics, gave the film's setting at that event an unintentional veneer of alternate history. He opined that "while Savard has her moments - including a deep cry backstage after capturing the bronze - she is not strong enough to do the heavy emotional lifting that the film's script requires. As written by Plante, Nadia is a woman at constant war with her instincts, requiring a performer to find a way to wordlessly convey such tension on-screen. Savard mostly offers faraway stares, frequently looking lost and in need of micro-managed direction". He concluded that the film "is not quite a medallist. But it's certainly a spirited contender".

Chris Knight of the National Post also concurred that the film's setting at an event that was cancelled in reality technically made it a science fiction movie, but praised Savard and the other non-professional actors in the cast for their naturalistic performances. He rated the film 4.5 stars out of five, concluding that "Nadia, Butterfly doesn’t feature any fireworks beyond the literal kind that mark those Games that never actually took place. But it doesn’t need to. The introspection and contemplative mood are all that is required to pull the viewer into this woman’s world. Nadia may have only come in third place at the Olympics, but Nadia, Butterfly takes the gold".

The film was named to TIFF's year-end Canada's Top Ten list for feature films.

Awards and nominations

References

External links
 
 

2020 films
2020s sports drama films
Canadian sports drama films
English-language Canadian films
Films shot in Montreal
Films about Olympic swimming and diving
Films shot in Tokyo
Films directed by Pascal Plante
2020 drama films
French-language Canadian films
2020s Canadian films